Korem 033/Wira Pratama, or Military Area Command 033rd/Wira Pratama is a Military Area Command (Korem) under Kodam I/Bukit Barisan. Its garrison is located on Pangkalpinang city, Bangka Belitung Islands. It consist of four Military District Commands (Kodim) divided into 34 Military District Command Sectors (Koramil) and one infantry battalion.

Units 

 Kodim 0315/Bintan
 Kodim 0316/Batam
 Kodim 0317/Tanjung Balai Karimun
 Kodim 0318/Natuna
 136th Raider Infantry Battalion/Tuah Sakti

References 

Military units and formations of Indonesia